Sir Gerard Braybrooke (before 1354 – 1429), of Colmworth, Bedfordshire, Horsenden, Buckinghamshire and Danbury, Essex, was an English politician.

He was MP for Bedfordshire in February 1388 and 1399 and for Essex in 1402 and 1417.

References

14th-century births
1429 deaths
People from the Borough of Bedford
People from Wycombe District
People from the City of Chelmsford
English MPs February 1388
English MPs 1399
English MPs 1402
English MPs 1417